Shahrab (also Romanized as ShahrĀb, Shahrāb, and Shehrāb) is a village in Kuh Panah Rural District, in the Central District of Tafresh County, Markazi Province, Iran. At the 2006 census, its population was 471, in 177 families.

References 

Populated places in Tafresh County